Yvon Côté (born 16 March 1939 in Asbestos, Quebec) is a former member of the House of Commons of Canada from 1988 to 1993. His career has been in teaching.

He was elected in the 1988 federal election at the Richmond—Wolfe electoral district for the Progressive Conservative party. He served in the 34th Canadian Parliament after which he was defeated by Gaston Leroux of the Bloc Québécois in the 1993 federal election.

References
 

1939 births
Living people
Members of the House of Commons of Canada from Quebec
People from Val-des-Sources
Progressive Conservative Party of Canada MPs